Theodore Curtis Dean (born March 24, 1938) is a former American football running back.  He played professionally in the National Football League (NFL) for the Philadelphia Eagles and the Minnesota Vikings. Dean played college football at Wichita State University.

Dean graduated from Radnor High School and earned All-State honors for football and track, and was named to the National High School All American team. At Wichita State University, Dean received Honorable Mention All American honors and earned All-Missouri Valley Conference accolades following his junior and senior seasons.

Dean was drafted by the Philadelphia Eagles in the fourth round (40th overall) of the 1960 NFL Draft. In his Rookie season, Dean led the NFL in kickoff returns and kickoff return yards gained. Dean's on-field success, which culminated in a game-winning touchdown for the Eagles in the 1960 NFL Championship Game, earned him a place in the 1961 Pro Bowl.

Following the 1960 season, Dean was hailed as an up-and-coming star. According to Ray Didinger, George Halas believed Dean was "going to become the best ever". However, Dean's football career was shortened by several injuries and his production never matched that of his rookie season. He was traded to the Minnesota Vikings prior to the 1964 NFL season, but only played in two games for the Vikings (his last two in the NFL) before an automobile accident caused further injuries.

Following his NFL career, Dean became an educator in the Philadelphia area.

References

1938 births
Living people
American football running backs
Minnesota Vikings players
Philadelphia Eagles players
Wichita State Shockers football players
Eastern Conference Pro Bowl players
People from Radnor Township, Pennsylvania
Players of American football from Pennsylvania
Sportspeople from Delaware County, Pennsylvania